The Bishop of Achonry is an episcopal title which takes its name after the village of Achonry in County Sligo, Ireland. In the Roman Catholic Church it remains as a separate title, but in the Church of Ireland it has been united with other bishoprics.

History
In the sixth century, the monastery at Achonry was founded by Saint Nathy, a disciple of Saint Finnian of Clonard. The superiors of the monastery were styled abbots or bishops of Achad Cain or Achad Conaire, and in some of the Irish annals they were called bishops of Luighne. It was not until 1152 that the Diocese of Achonry was established at the Synod of Kells.

During the Reformation, the bishops changed their allegiance back and forth between the Pope and the Tudors. After the Reformation, there were parallel apostolic successions: one of the Church of Ireland and the other of the Roman Catholic Church.

In the Church of Ireland, the see of Achonry continued as a separate title until 1622 when it combined with Killala to form the united bishopric of Killala and Achonry. Under the Church Temporalities (Ireland) Act 1833, the combined sees Killala and Achonry became part of the archbishopric of Tuam in 1834. On the death of Archbishop Le Poer Trench in 1839, the Ecclesiastical Province of Tuam lost its metropolitan status and became the united bishopric of Tuam, Killala and Achonry in the Ecclesiastical Province of Armagh.

In the Roman Catholic Church, Achonry remains a separate title. The Roman Catholic bishop's seat (Cathedra) is now located at the Cathedral Church of the Annunciation of the Blessed Virgin Mary and St. Nathy in Ballaghaderreen, County Roscommon. The current incumbent is the Most Reverend Paul Dempsey, Bishop of the Roman Catholic Diocese of Achonry, who was appointed by Pope Francis on 27 January 2020, and ordained bishop on 30 August 2020.

Pre-Reformation bishops

Bishops during the Reformation

Post-Reformation bishops

Church of Ireland succession

Roman Catholic succession

Notes
 Maghnus Ó hEadhra and Richard Belmer were bishops at the same time.

See also

 Roman Catholic Diocese of Achonry
 Archdiocese of Tuam (Church of Ireland)
 Diocese of Tuam, Killala and Achonry

References

Bibliography

  
 
 

Roman Catholic Diocese of Achonry
 Bishops
Lists of Irish bishops and archbishops
Bishops of Tuam or Killala or of Achonry
 Roman Catholic